Flynn was an electoral division of the Legislative Assembly in Australia's Northern Territory. It existed between 1983 and 1990 and was named after John Flynn, founder of the Royal Flying Doctor Service.

Members for Flynn

Election results

Elections in the 1980s

 Two party preferred vote is estimated.

References

Former electoral divisions of the Northern Territory